The Barefoot Man, born George Nowak, is an entertainer and songwriter who performs primarily in the Cayman Islands, specifically on the largest island of Grand Cayman. He has composed about 2,000 songs and has recorded nearly 500 of them. The Barefoot Man and his Band performed for many years at the Holiday Inn on the Seven Mile Beach of Grand Cayman. This hotel, however, no longer exists. He now performs primarily at the Reef Resort and at The Wharf in Grand Cayman. The Barefoot Man has been commonly compared to other island performers and songwriters like Jimmy Buffett.

Barefoot's songs are predominantly risqué parody, pun and double entendre put to reggae, calypso and sometimes country or pop beats.

The Barefoot Man and Band was featured in the 1993 film, The Firm, starring actors Tom Cruise and Gene Hackman. For this film, George Nowak wrote the song "Money, Money, Money" which appears on the film's soundtrack. The song was performed and recorded by the band that he performed with at the Holiday Inn on Grand Cayman.

He currently lives in the village of Breakers on the island of Grand Cayman and still performs for tourists several nights per week (when he's not off on some remote island fishing). He is also a contributing writer for several island publications.

Early years
Nowak was the son of a German merchant seaman who abandoned ship when George was very young. George's mother remarried, this time to an American serviceman and they moved to Wilmington, North Carolina where he attended high school. He graduated in 1968 and immediately moved to Nashville to "...write a country hit...to buy (his) own Island."

Nowak details events from his life, including his early years in the book Which way to the Islands? – a collection of short stories and photos. In this book George reveals that during the Vietnam War (circa 1968), he went by the alias Barefoot Man while living "off the radar" in a club trading work for room and board since he could not procure a work permit with this name.

Barefoot Man Albums (Released as Records and / or Cassette Tapes)

Barefoot Man Albums (Released Primarily as CDs)

References

External links
 Official website

Year of birth missing (living people)
Living people
German songwriters
Caymanian culture